is a rural district located in southern Yamanashi Prefecture, Japan.

As of July 2012, the district had an estimated population of 39,636 and a population density of 40.3 persons per km2. The total area was 984.47 km2.

Towns and villages
The district currently consists of the following four towns: 
Fujikawa
Hayakawa
Minobu
Nanbu

History
Minamikoma District was founded during the early Meiji period establishment of the municipalities system on July 22, 1878 and initially consisted of 22 villages.

Recent mergers
On March 1, 2003 the town of Tomizawa merged into the new town of Nanbu.
On September 13, 2004 the town of Minobu merged with the towns of Nakatomi and Shimobe, from Nishiyatsushiro District, to form the new town of Minobu.
On March 8, 2010 the towns of Masuho and Kajikazawa merged to form the new town of Fujikawa.

Districts in Yamanashi Prefecture
1878 establishments in Japan